Ulises Dagoberto Poirier Puelma (2 February 1897 – 9 March 1977) was a Chilean football defender.

He was the second oldest player listed in the squads for the inaugural World Cup held in Uruguay in 1930. Belgian goalkeeper Jean de Bie is the only player to have participated in a World Cup finals who was born before Poirier.

References

External links

1897 births
1977 deaths
Chilean footballers
Chile international footballers
1930 FIFA World Cup players
Association football defenders
People from Quillota